Horsbrugh is a surname. Notable people with the surname include:

Boyd Robert Horsbrugh (1871–1916), English ornithologist and military officer
Florence Horsbrugh, Baroness Horsbrugh (1889–1969), Scottish politician
Oliver Horsbrugh (1937–2009), British television director
Patrick Horsbrugh (1920–2014), British architecture professor

See also 

 Horsburgh (surname)